HMY Katherine, the second ship of that name, was an English royal yacht, built in 1674 at Chatham for the Royal Navy.

References 

1670s ships
Royal Yachts of the Kingdom of England